Abbé Raoul Maurice Jean Carton (1879 – 7 July 1934) was a French philosopher.

Life
Raoul Maurice Jean Carton was born in Blois, France, in 1879. A Catholic priest, he became professor of philosophy at Stanislas College and the Catholic Institute in Paris. He particularly focused on the work of Roger Bacon, who had been considered a lone scientific genius by 19th century scholarship but whom Carton and others labored to return to his medieval context. He died in Paris on 7 July 1934.

Works
 . 
 . 
 . 
 . 

1879 births
1934 deaths
French philosophers
Academic staff of the Institut Catholique de Paris